This is a list of television networks by country.

Åland Islands

 Åland24
 TV Åland
 D Channel
 A1
 A2
 A24
 ATVR(Åland Island television radio)

Afghanistan

 RTA TV
 Ariana TV
 Tolo TV
 Tolo News
 Tamadon TV
 Metra Television
 Shamshad TV
 ANAAR TV
 Pashto TV
 Zhwandon TV
 Zan TV
 Banoo TV
 Jawanan Afghanistan TV
 Mishrano Jirga TV
 MTV Asia
 VH1 Asia
 MTV2 Asia
 Afghani TV
 Afghani 24
 1TV (Afghanistan)
 2TV (Afghanistan)

Albania

 Syri TV
 TV Klan
 Nan Tul Kanäl
 TVSH 1 (RTSH 1)
 TVSH 2 (RTSH 2)
 TVSH 3 (RTSH 3)
 TVSH Film (RTSH Film)
 TVSH Muzikë (RTSH Music)
 TVSH Shqip (RTSH Shqip)
 TVSH Fëmijë (RTSH Kids)
 TVSH Sport (RTSH Sports)
 TVSH Plus (RTSH Plus)
 TVSH 24 (RTSH 24)
 TVSH Sat (RTSH Satellite)
 TVSH Kuvend (RTSH Parliament)
 A2 CNN
 BBC World
 Euronews Albania
 Vizion Plus
 Klan Plus
 News 24
 13TV
 BBF TV
 ABC News (Albanian TV channel)
 UTV News (Albania)
 OBTV
 Report TV
 Top Channel
 Alsat M

Algeria

 ENTV (Entreprise Nationale de la Télévision)
 Canal Algérie
 Algérie 3 (Thalitha TV)
 Tamazight TV 4
 Coran TV 5
 News TV Algeria
 Echorouk TV
 27TV
 15TV
 DTV 1
 DTV 2
 Ennahar TV
 El-Djazairia TV
 El Bahia TV
 El Bilad TV
 Echorouk Benna TV
 Echorouk News TV
 Beur TV
 El Heddaf TV
 Chams TV
 El Fedjr TV
 Dzair TV
 Dzair News
 Samira TV
 Numdia TV
 El Edjwaa TV
 Al Hayat TV
 Al Anis TV

American Samoa

 K34HI (Fox)
 K36GY
 KJCP-LP
 KVZK-1 (MTV American Samoa)
 KVZK-2 (PBS)
 KVZK-3 (MTV Hits American Samoa)
 KVZK-4 (ABC/CBS)
 KVZK-5 (ABC/CBS)
 RNHA-LP (ABC)
 SPI American Samoa
 FilmBox Russia
 Kino Polska International
 Timeless Drama Channel

Andorra

 ATV (Andorra Televisió)
 ATV2 (Andorra Televisió 2)
 ATV3 in English (Andorra Television 3 in English)

Angola

 TPA (Televisão Pública de Angola)
 TPA1
 TPA2
 TPA Internacional
 TV Zimbo
 RecordTV África
 ZAP Novelas
 TV Angola
 A1 Angola
 A2 Angola
 A3 Angola
 A4 Angola
 Viacom Angola
 MTV Angola
 VH1 Angola
 Nickelodeon Angola
 ZTV (Angola)

Anguilla

 ATV Anguilla
 PJF-TV 3
 PJR-TV 17
 R1
 R2
 R24
 BN TV Anguilla
 BBC World News

Antigua and Barbuda

 ABS-TV

Argentina

 América TV
 Televisión Pública Argentina
 El Nueve
 Telefe
 El Trece
 NET TV

Armenia

 Armenia TV
 Public Television of Armenia
 Shant TV
 ATV

Aruba

 ATV Channel 15
 Bo Canal 24
 TeleAruba

Australia

 ABC
 ABC TV
 ABC TV Plus
 ABC Me
 ABC News
 ABC Kids (Australia)
 SBS
 SBS
 SBS Viceland
 NITV
 SBS World Movies
 SBS Food
 SBS WorldWatch
 Seven West Media
 Seven Network
 7two
 7mate
 7flix
 7Bravo
 Nine Entertainment Co.
Nine Network
 9Go!
 9Gem
 9Life
 9Rush
 Ten Network Holdings
 Network 10
 10 Peach
 10 Bold
 10 Shake
 Gecko
 TVSN
 Aboriginal Broadcasting Australia
 Aboriginal TV Channel 4
 Darwin TV Channel 41
 Tourism TV Channel 42
 Education Business TV Channel 43
 WIN Corporation
 WIN Television
 Gold
 Sky News Regional
 Imparja Television Pty Limited
 Imparja Television
 Southern Cross Austereo
 10 (Southern Cross Austereo)
 Seven (Southern Cross Austereo)
 Sky News Regional

Austria

 ORF1 Österreichischer Rundfunk 1, public broadcaster
 ORF2 Österreichischer Rundfunk 2, public broadcaster
 ORF III Österreichischer Rundfunk 3, culture and information broadcaster
 ORF Sport +
 3sat — in association with ARD, ZDF and SRF
 ATV Austria TV, first and biggest private broadcaster
 Puls 4 Second biggest private broadcaster
 Servus TV Private broadcaster
 Austria 9 TV Private broadcaster
 LT1 Linz Television, local broadcaster for Upper Austria
 Inn-Sat Local broadcaster for Tyrol
 TW1
 Go TV Music Television Station
 24TV (Austria only) – News

Azerbaijan

 ANS TV
 CBC
 Ictimai TV
 Idman Azerbaijan TV
 Lider TV
 Space TV
 Xazar
 ANTV.WS
 Azad Azerbaijan TV
 AzTV

Regional networks
 Regional TV (Khachmas City)
 Nakhchivan TV  (Nakhchivan Autonomous Republic)
 Alternativ (Ganja)
 Kapaz TV  (Ganja)
 Dunya TV (Sumgayit)
 Qutb TV (Quba)
 Xayal TV  (Quba)
 Mingachevir TV (Mingachevir)
 Canub TV (Lankaran)
 Simurq (Tovuz)
 Aygun TV (Zagatala)

Bahamas

 ZNS-TV

Bahrain

 Bahrain TV
 Bahrain TV Ch. 55
 Bahrain TV Sports
 Geo TV Middle East
 Marhaba TV
 Orbit Channel
 Al Fann (Orbit)
 Al Riyadiyah (Orbit)
 Al Safwah (Orbit)
 Al-Yawm (Orbit)
 America Plus (Orbit)
 Arabic Series Channel (Orbit)
 Cinema 1  (Orbit)
 Cinema 2 (Orbit)
 Cinema City (Orbit)
 Fun Channel (Orbit)
 Hollywood Channel (Orbit)
 MGM (Orbit)
 Music Now (Orbit)
 Orbit – ESPN Sports
 Orbit Al Oula
 Orbit Express Shop
 Orbit Nature
 Orbit News
 Orbit Promo Channel
 Orbit Sports Channel
 Super Comedy (Orbit)
 Super Movies (Orbit)
 Super Movies +1 (Orbit)
 TV Max 1 (Orbit)
 TV Max 2 (Orbit)
 TV Max 3 (Orbit)
 TV Max 4 (Orbit)
 MTV Bahrain
 STAR TV (Satellite Television for Asian Region Bahrain)
 CNBC Europe
 Fox Sports
 ITV Choice
 NGA Bahrain
 National Geographic Channel Bahrain
 Sky News
 STAR Gold
 STAR Movies
 STAR News
 STAR One
 STAR Plus
 STAR World

Bangladesh

 BTV
 BTV Chittagong
 ATN Bangla
 Channel i
 Ekushey Television
 NTV
 BTV World
 RTV
 Boishakhi Television
 Banglavision
 Desh TV
 My TV
 ATN News
 Mohona TV
 Bijoy TV
 Sangsad Television
 Somoy TV
 Independent Television
 Maasranga Television
 Channel 9
 Channel 24
 GTV
 Ekattor
 Asian TV
 SA TV
 Gaan Bangla
 Jamuna Television
 Deepto TV
 DBC News
 News24
 Bangla TV
 Duronto TV
 Nagorik
 Ananda TV
 T Sports
 Nexus Television
 Ekhon
 Global Television

Barbados

 Caribbean Broadcasting Corporation
 CBC-TV 8
 Caribbean Media Corporation
 CaribVision (Internationally broadcast)
 Public Broadcast Service
 Discover Barbados TV
 Cinestream TV
 Gone Viral TV
 Gone Viral Music
 Gone Viral Vogue
 Gone Viral X-Treme
 Vamos Viral TV
 The Beat 104
 Tempo TV

Belarus

Belgium

Others:
Timeless Drama Channel

Belize

 Centaur Cable Network (Channel 3 Orange Walk)
 Great Belize Television (Channel 5)
 Tropical Vision Limited (Channel 7)
 Krem Television (Channel 15 terrestrial and cable)
 Love Belize Television (cable only)
 MTV Belize (Channel 1 Viacom Belize)
 MTV2 Belize (Channel 2 Viacom Belize)
 VH1 Belize (Channel 4 Viacom Belize) (Digital and Analog only)
 VH1 Classic Belize (Channel 6 Viacom Belize) (Analog only)
 SoTV

Benin

 BB-24 (Benin Business 24)
 ORTB
 Canal 3 Monde
 Eden TV Benin
 LC2 International
 Evangelique TV
 La Beninoise TV
 Sikka TV
 TV Carrefour
 La Flamme

Bermuda

 Bermuda Broadcasting Company
 ZFB-TV (ABC/BBCWN) 7 – Hamilton, Bermuda
 ZBM-TV (CBS) 9 – Hamilton
 VSB-TV (NBC) 11 – Hamilton
 BBC World News
 NBC
 ABC
 CBS

Bhutan

 BBS-TV (Bhutan Broadcasting Service)

Bolivia

 Activa TV
 ATB Red Nacional
 Bolivisión (Canal 4)
 Red A.D. Venir Internacional
  Red P.A.T.
 Red Uno de Bolivia
 SET (Sony Entertainment TV Latin America)
 Televisión Boliviana
 Televisión Católica
 TV Boliviana Internacional
 Unitel (Canal 9 Santa Cruz)
 Cadena A
 Megavision
 Univalle TV

Bonaire

 Flamingo Broadcasting Network N.V. (FBN) TV11
Dutch Caribbean TV

Bosnia and Herzegovina

 Alternativna TV
 Animal Planet
 Balkanika Music TV
 Balkanmedia TV
 BHT 1
 BN TV
 Boomerang
 BosTel
 Cartoon Network
 Discovery Channel
 Discovery Home & Health
 Discovery Real Time
 Disney XD
 Disney Channel
 Disney Junior
 Eurosport
 Eurosport 1
 Eurosport 2
 Euronews
 Extreme Sports
 FilmBox Extra HD
 FilmBox Plus
 History Channel
 Motors TV
 Mreza Plus
 MTV Adria
 MTV Base
 MTV Dance
 MTV Hits
 MTV Rocks
 NASN
 National Geographic Channel
 Nickelodeon
 Nick Jr.
 NTV Hayat
 OBN (Open Broadcast Network)
 Pink Bosnia & Herzegovina (Replaced by Nova BH)
 RTRS Banja Luka
 Svet Plus
 TCM
 Travel Channel
 TDC
 TV Mostar
 TVUSK
 VH1
 VH1 Classic
 Vikom TV

Botswana

 Botswana TV
 Botswana TV
 Botswana TV 2
 Botswana TV 3
 Bleesing TV
 Access TV HD
 Khuduga HD
 eBotswana TV
Maru TV
NOWTV!
Hub TV

Brazil

British Indian Ocean Territory

 British Forces Broadcasting Service
 Armed Forces Radio and Television Service

British Virgin Islands

 ITC (Information TV Channel)
 BBC World News

Brunei

 RTB Perdana
 RTB Aneka
 RTB Sukmaindera

Bulgaria

Burkina Faso

 RTB – (Radio Television du Burkina) – Public
 RTB2 – (Radio Television du Burkina) – Public, Regional
 SMTV (Sport & Music Television) – Private
 Canal 3 – (Canal 3 Burkina) – Private
 CVK (Canal Viim Koega) – Christian
 TVZ Africa – Private
 BF1 (La télé qui ose) – Private
 MTV Burkina Faso (La musica de Burkina) – Public
 VH1 Burkina Faso (La musica de VH1 Burkina) – Public
 8.1 Network – Public
 R6 TV – Chat And News Channel
 24TV – News

Burundi

 RTNB (Radiodiffusion et Télévision Nationale du Burundi)

Cambodia

 Hang Meas HDTV
 Rasmey Hang Meas HDTV
 PNN TV Cambodia
 Bayon TV
 CTV 9 (Cambodia)
 CTN (Cambodia TV Network)
 CTN International
 TV5 Cambodia
 TVK
 TV3 Cambodia
 Apsara TV
 MyTV (Cambodia)
 SEATV (Southeast Asia Television)

Cameroon

 Afrique media
 CRTV  (Cameroon Radio and Television)
 STV
 BOOMTV
 CANAL1
 CANAL2 International
 Liberty TV (Liberty Ministry International)
 LTV
 LTV2
 LTV3
 LTV4
 LTV24
 KCBS TV (Kumba City Broadcasting Service)
 Equinoxe TV
 LTM TV
 CRTV2  (Cameroon Radio and Television 2)
 CRTV24  (Cameroon Radio and Television 24)
 KCBS
 MTV Cameroon
 MTV Base Africa
 MTV Hits Cameroon
 VH1 Cameroon
 VH1 Classic Europe
 MTV Classic Cameroon
 1TV
 2TV
 3TV
 4TV
 MTV Music Cameroon
 MTV OMG
 MTV Live HD Cameroon
 TV Africa (Cameroon)
 TV Africa (Nigeria)
 LTV5
 LTV News
 RTB Perdana
 RTB Aneka
 LTV6
 LTV Music
 CRTV3 (Cameroon Radio and Television 3)
 NT1 Cameroon
 NT2 Cameroon
 5TV
 6TV
 SeTV
 Yaoundé TV Cameroon
 LTV7
 LTV Music 2
 LTV1 HD
 LTV Sat
 LTV2 HD
 LTV World
 bTV (Bulgaria)
 LTV Life
 LTV Animal World
 NT6

Canada

Cape Verde

 RTC (Rádio e Televisão de Cabo Verde)

Cayman Islands

 Cayman 27
 Island 24
 Discover Cayman Info Channel
 C3
 BBC World News
 LIME
 Logic
 WestStar
 Costless
 Discovery Cayman Islands
 Discovery Channel
 TLC
 Television Romance

Central African Republic

 Central African Republic Communications
 Télé Centrafrique
 MTV Base Africa
 CAF TV (Central African Republic TV)

Chad

 Télé Tchad
 MTV Arabia
 MTV Base Africa
 Ennahar TV Chad
 MTV Music

Chile

China

Colombia

 ABN (Avivamiento Broadcasting Network)
 Body Channel
 Cadena Uno
 Canaan TV
 Canal 13 (Teve Andina)
 Canal A
 Canal Capital
 Canal del Humor
 Canal Institucional
 Canal TRO
 Canal Uno
 Caracol TV
 Caracol TV Internacional
 Cinema +
 Citytv Bogotá
 CMB TV
 CNC ( Canal Noti Colombia)
 Cosmovision
 Cristovisión
 Despecho TV
 El Kanal
 Gran Hermano
 Guasca TV
 Viacom Colombia
 Hallmark Channel Latin America
 MTV Latin America
 MTV Hits Latin America
Nickelodeon Latin America
 Humor Channel
 K Music
 Radiola TV
 RCN TV
 TV Colombia
 Nuestra Tele Noticias 24 Horas
 Señal Colombia
 SET (Sony Entertainment TV Latin America)
 Telea
 Teleantioquia
 Telecafé
 Telecaribe
 Telepacífico
 Telemedellín
 Televida Colombia
 TV Agro
 TV Prensa

Comoros

 ORTC (Office de Radio Télévision des Comores)
 Parabole Comores
 GRTV (Office de Radio Télévision des mbeni Comores)

Democratic Republic of the Congo

 RTNC (Radio Télévision Nationale Congolaise)
 Canal Tropical TV (Tropicana TV)
 Bethlem Tv-radio (Office de Radio-Télévision de Seleani Comores)
 Karthala Tv-radio (Office de Radio-Télévision de Karthala Comores)
 RTCT (Radio Télévision Caummunautaire Tayna)
 DiaspoRDC
 Digital Congo
 MTV Congo
 Canal CVV International
 KinWeb TV
 RTVS 1 (Le Congo a travels le monde)
 RTVS 2
 Tele 50
 RTGA @ Groupe L'Avenir
 B-One TV
 Couleur TV
 CANAL+
 Aforevo

Republic of the Congo

 RTC (Radiodiffusion Télévision Congolaise)
 Africanews
 Top TV
 MTV Congo
 DRTV International

Cook Islands

 CITV (Cook Islands Television)

Costa Rica

 Canal 19 San Jose
 Conexión TV – Canal 2
 Cristovisión – Canal 31
 Enlace TBN
 Extra TV 42
 FCN (Family Christian Network)
 Mega Hits – Canal 38
 Repretel (Canal 11)
 Repretel (Canal 4)
 Repretel (Canal 6)
 Sinart – Canal 13
 Spectamerica Televisión – Canal 9
 University of Costa Rica Canal 15
 TBN Enlace Juvenil
 Telecatólica – Canal 48
 Telefides
 Telepaz – Canal 52
 Teletica – Canal 7
 TV Catolica – Canal 46
 Tv33magazine
 VM Latino – Canal 29

Croatia

Cuba

 Canal Habana
 Canal Educativo
 Canal Educativo 2
 Cubavisión
 Cubavision International – overseas broadcasts
 Tele Rebelde
 TeleSUR
 Multivision 
 Canal Caribe
 Canal Clave

Curaçao

 TeleCuraçao
 TV 11
 HIT TV

Cyprus

 Alpha TV Cyprus
 ANT1 Cyprus
 BBC World News
 Bayrak TV
 BTV
 CyprusDirect.tv
 Extra TV
 FETV (Far East TV)
 Globe Documentaries Channel
 Home & Travel
 Kibris Genc TV
 Lumiere TV

 Mega Channel Cyprus
 Nicosia Race Club
 RIK 1
 RIK 2
 RIK Sat
 SAT 7
 SAT 7 Pars
 Sigma TV
 Sigma Sports
 Telestar TV

Czech Republic

 ČT1 (Česká televize) Česká televize 1 / Jednička, public broadcaster
 ČT2 (Česká televize) Česká televize 2 / Dvojka, public broadcaster (documentary channel)
 ČT24 (Česká televize) Česká televize 24 / Čtyřiadvacítka, public broadcaster (news channel)
 ČT Sport (Česká televize) Česká televize Sport / Sport, public broadcaster (sport channel)
 TV Prima (TV Prima) Televize Prima, private broadcaster
 Prima Cool (TV Prima) Prima COOL, private broadcaster (films and series)
 TV R1 (TV Prima) R1 televize, private broadcaster (regional news)
 Timeless Drama Channel (SPI International), private broadcaster (series channel)
 TV Nova (TV Nova) Televize Nova, private broadcaster
 FilmBox Premium (SPI International), private broadcaster (movie channel)
 FunBox UHD (SPI International), private broadcaster (UHD channel)
 FilmBox Plus (SPI International), private broadcaster (movie channel)
 Nova Cinema (TV Nova) Nova Cinema, private broadcaster (films and series)
 FilmBox Family (SPI International), private broadcaster (movie for kids channel)
 Nova Sport (TV Nova) Nova Sport, private broadcaster (sport channel – Pay TV)
 Czech-Slovak MTV (TV Nova) Česko-Slovenská MTV, private broadcaster (music channel – Pay TV)
 Barrandov TV (Barrandov Studios) Televize Barrandov, private broadcaster
 Óčko (MAFRA) Óčko, private broadcaster (music channel)
 FilmBox (SPI International) Filmbox / FilmBox, private broadcaster (movie channel)
 FilmBox Extra HD (SPI International), private broadcaster (movie channel)
 Z1 TV (J&T Media Enterprises) Televize Z1, private broadcaster (news/economic channel)
 Public TV  (PublicCom) Televize Public, private broadcaster (lifestyle channel)
 TV Noe (TELEPACE) Televize Noe, catholic church (Christian channel)

Denmark

 24 Nordjyske
 6eren
 Canal+ Sport Danmark
 Canal+ Sport HD Skandinavien
Cartoon Network Scandinavia
 Viasat Sport Danmark
 Viasat Motor Danmark
 Dantoto Racing
 Discovery Channel (Danmark)
 DK 4
 DK 4 Sport
 DR1
 DR2
 DR3
 DR Ramasjang
 DR Ultra
 DR K
 ECTV (Eurasian Christian Television)
 Hallmark Channel Scandilux
 Kanal 4
 Kanal 5
 Kanal 5 HD
 MTV Denmark
Nickelodeon Denmark
 SBS Net
 Silver HD
 National Geographic Channel Denmark
 The Voice TV Danmark
 TV 2 Charlie
 TV 2 Danmark
 TV 2 Film
 TV 2 News
 TV 2 Sport
 TV 2 Zulu
 TV3+
 TV 3 Danmark

Djibouti 

 Radio Television of Djibouti

Dominica

 DBC (Dominica Broadcasting Corporation)
 Marpin Telecoms & Broadcasting

Dominican Republic

 Ame 47 Canal 47
 Antena 21
 Antena Latina – Canal 7
 Aster TV Canal 8
 Cana TV
 Canal 25 – Canal 25
 Carivision International
 CDN (Cadena de Noticias)
 CERTV-Corporacion Estatal Radio Television – Canal 4
 Color Visión (Canal 9)
 Coral 39 – Canal 39
 Digital 15
 Isla Vision – Canal 53
 MegaVision – Canal 43
 Micro Vision – Canal 10
 Musavision – Canal 10
 Quisqueya TV
 Santo Domingo TV
 Sport Vision 35 TV
 Supercanal 33 – Canal 33
 Supercanal Caribe
 Super TV 55 – Canal 55
 TeleAntillas – Canal 2
 Tele Canal
 Telecentro – Canal 13
 Telefuturo – Canal 23
 Telemicro Canal 5
 Telesistema – Canal 11
 Tele Union – Canal 45
 Teleuniverso|TU (Teleuniverso) – Canal 29
 TV Plata – Canal 3
 TRA -Tele Radio America – Canal 45
 Vegateve
 Virus Television – Canal 20
 Yuna Vision

Ecuador

 Canal 1 Ecuador
 Canal 1 Internacional
 Ecuavisa
 Ecuavisa Internacional
 ECTV (Ecuador)
 Gama TV
 Hallmark Channel Latin America
 RTS Ecuador
 TC Television
 Teleamazonas
 Teleamazonas Internacional
 Telecuador
 TeleSUR
 Unsion TV
 Zaracay TV Canal 5

Egypt

 TEN TV
 Free TV
 Rotana Aflam
 Rotana Cinema
 Rotana Classic
 Rotana Clip
 Rotana Drama
 Rotana Khalijia
 Rotana Masriya
 Rotana Music
 CBC TV
 CBC DRAMA TV
 CBC EXTRA
 Dream
 Al Nahar TV
 Al Nahar Drama
 Al Nahar Cinema
 Mazzika
 Mazzika Zoom
 Melody Aflam
 MTV Middle East/Africa
 MTV Arabia
 MTV2
 ON sport
 ON E
 ON Live
 ON Drama
 DMC
 DMC Drama
 DMC SPORTS
 ERTU 1
 MBC 1
 MBC 2
 MBC 3
 MBC 4
 MBC Bollywoods
 MBC Drama
 MBC Masr
 MBC Masr 2
 MBC Max
 MBC Plus Drama
 Sada El Balad
 Sada El Balad 2
 Sada El Balad Drama
 Cartoon Network Arabic
 Fox Masr

El Salvador

Equatorial Guinea

 Radio Nacional de Guinea Equatorial
 Asonga TV

Eritrea 

 Eri-TV
 Berhan-TV
 EriSat
 Asenatv 
 AlenaTv

Estonia

Ethiopia

Falkland Islands

 KTV
 BFBS TV 1
 BFBS TV 2 (Mount Pleasant base area only)
 BBC World News

Faroe Islands

 Kringvarp Føroya

Fiji

 Fiji One
 Fiji Two
 Sky Mix
 Fiji Television
 Sky Entertainment (SKY Pacific)
 Sky 1
 Sky 2
 FBC TV
 Sky 3
 Mai TV

Finland

 C More Emothion
 Viasat Sport Finland
 Viasat Sport HD
 Hallmark Channel Scandilux
 Jim (Former Nelonen Plus)
 Nelonen Prime
 MTV Nordic (Replaced by MTV Finland)
 MTV2 Finland
 MTV3 (Mainos-TV) – commercial station
 MTV Fakta
 MTV Max
 Nelonen (Channel Four Finland) – commercial station
 Silver HD
 Sub (TV channel)
 MTV Juniori
 MTV Leffa
Nickelodeon Finland
 Kutonen
 Toto TV
 Nelonen Pro 1
 Nelonen Pro 2
 Yleisradio (Yle, Finnish Broadcasting Company) – state broadcaster
 Yle TV1
 Yle TV2
 Yle Fem
 Yle Teema
 TV Finland

France

French Guiana

Most channels from France are available in French Guiana.
 ACG (Antenne Creole Guyane)
 Canal+ Guyane
 France 3
 France 24
 France 5
 France Ô
 RFO Télé Guyane
 MTV Base French Guiana
 MTV French Guiana
 MTV Hits
 MTV Music
 MTV Dance
 MTV Rocks
Nickelodeon
 France 1
 France 2
 TF1
 FilmBox Russia
 France 4
 TFX
 Timeless Drama Channel

French Polynesia

 Canal+ Polynesie
 France 1
 France 2
 FilmBox Russia
 France Ô
 MTV Polynesie
 RFO Polynésie
 TNTV (Tahiti Nui Television)
 Timeless Drama Channel

French Southern and Antarctic Lands

 Parabole Mayotte

Gabon

 Africa1
 Radio Bethel
 Radio Bonne Nouvelle
 RTG1 (Radio Télévision Gabonaise 1)
 RTG2 (Radio Télévision Gabonaise 2)
 Radio Television Nazareth
 TeleAfrica
 TV+
 RTN

Gambia

 GRTS (Gambia Radio & Television Service)
 QTV

Georgia

 N1 News Channel OF Georgia – Palitranews
 Alania TV
 Adjara TV
 Akhazia TV
 N2 News Channel OF Georgia and Akhazia
 GPB (Georgian Public Broadcasting)
 Imedi TV
 MZE TV
 Rustavi 2

Germany

Ghana

 MTA Ghana
 Multi TV
 Christian Entertainment TV
 Crystal TV
 GTV (Ghana)
 MTV Ghana
 MTV Base Africa
 MTV Hits Africa
Nickelodeon Africa
 Metro TV (Metropolitan Entertainment TV)
 Beutchland TV Botswana
 TV Africa
 TV3
 NET2 TV
 Media TV
 U TV (United TV)
 TopTV (Ghana)
 Viasat1 TV
 GHone TV
 Kantanka Tv
 Adom Tv
 GTV Government
 Homebase
 Top Tv
 Light Tv
 Net2 tv
 E Tv
 Max Tv
 GBC24
 GTV life
 GTV Sport
 Obononu Tv
 Family Tv
 Agoo Tv
 Al Jazeera
 Atinka Tv
 Tv7
 Pralse Tv
 4Syte Tv
 Fire Tv
 Oceans Tv
 Smile
 Angel Tv
 Joy Prime
 FD Guide Tv
 BOC Tv
 7 Plus
 France 24-France
 Sports24
 Faith Tv
 SpyderLee Ent Tv
 TV1 Ghana
 TV2 Ghana
 KFM Tv
 Star Tv
 Campus Tv
 ATV
 EBN
 BTA
 Rhema Tv
 wise TV
 ATN

Gibraltar

 Diva Futura Channel
 Diva Futura Live
 Diva Futura Plus
 Diva Futura Sex
 Diva Futura TV
 GBC Television (Gibraltar Broadcasting Corporation)
 Traumgirls TV
 BBC World News
 BBC One

Greece

Greenland

 KNR (Kalaallit Nunaata Radioa)
 TV Nutaaq

Grenada

 GBN TV (Grenada Broadcasting Network)
 Gayelle - The Channel

Guadeloupe

 AWA CSTV (Caribbean Sky Satellite TV)
 AWA Junior
 AWA Music
 Canal+ Antilles
 FilmBox Russia
 MTV Guadeloupe
 France Ô
 RFO Télé Guadeloupe
 Timeless Drama Channel

Guam

 KUAM-TV 8 (NBC)
 KGTF 12 (PBS)
 KTGM 14 (ABC)
 KEQI-LD 22 (IND)
 KTKB-LP 26 (IND)
 K28HS-D 28
 K30HB-D 30
 K32GB-D 32
 K36GJ-D 36

Guatemala

VHF
 Canal 3 (Albavision)
 Canal 5 TV Maya
 Canal 7 Televisiete (Albavision)
 Canal 9 TV Congreso (Off air)
 Canal 11 Tele-Once (Albavision)
 Canal 13 Trecevisión (Albavision)
UHF
 Canal 19 Albanoticias -mirrored- (Albavision)
 Canal 21 Enlace
 Canal 23 Albanoticias (Albavision)
 Canal 25 Guatevision
 Canal 27 El canal de la Esperanza
 Canal 31 TV Azteca Guatemala
 Canal 33 TV USAC
 Canal 35 TV Azteca Guatemala
 Canal 37 Telecentro -mirrored- (Albavision)
 Canal 41 Telecentro (Albavision)
 Canal 61 Enlace Juvenil
 Canal 63 Televisión Arquidiocesana
 Canal 65 Family TV
Satellite
 18–50 TV
 Canal Antigua
 Vea Canal
 Guatevision

Guatemala does not have a digital terrestrial standard yet, but it seems that ISDB-T will be the norm.
Albavision used to broadcast for 4 years in the ATSC norm on channel 19 HDTV, but is back to analog on that same frequency.

Guinea

 Radio Télévision Guinéenne (RTG)
 Channel K

Guinea-Bissau

 EM TV (EM TV Guinea-Bissau)

Guyana

 Guyana TV
 Safe Television; Channel 2
 CNS; Channel l6
 WHRM; Channel 7
 Dave's Television; Channel 8
 Hotte Blackman Television; Channel 9
 National Communications Network; Channel 14 11
 Multi Technology Vision; Channel 14
 HGPTV: Channel 16
 National Television Network (NTN); Channel 18
 Hits and Jams Television (formally STVS); Channel 21 or 72
 Television Guyana; Channel 28
 Guyana Learning Channel Trust (formally Learning Channel ETBS); Channel 29 or Channel 9 
 Skar Television (formally Vision TV); Channel 46, 102, and 7

Haiti

 TQ (Tele Quisqueya)
 TNH (Télévision Nationale d'Haïti)
 Tele L.J.S (Saint-Marc, Haiti)

Honduras

 Televisión Educativa Nacional, TEN Canal 10
 CampusTV Honduras Canal 59.1 el primer canal digital en alta definición
 Canal 11 Honduras
 CANAL 48 - El Canal de la Solidaridad
 Canal 5 El Líder
 CBC Canal 6 Internacional
 JBN (Jesus Broadcasting Network)
 Maya TV
 SOTEL Canal 11
 Telecadena (7 & 4)
 Telesistema Hondureno
 CCI Channel
 RTV Honduras

Hong Kong

Hungary

Iceland

1. RÚV
2. Stöð 2
3. Sjónvarp Símans
4. Hringbraut
5. N4

India

 Disney Star
 Zee Entertainment Enterprises
 Viacom18
 Culver Max Entertainment
 Enterr10 Television Network
 Shemaroo Entertainment
 Warner Bros. Discovery India
 Doordarshan
 Sun TV Network
 ETV Network
 Odisha Television Network
 Sidharth TV Network
 9X Media
 B4U
 Pen India Limited
 Sri Adhikari Brothers Television Network Ltd
 Media Worldwide Limited
 The Walt Disney Company India
 The Times Group
 ViacomCBS Networks EMEAA
 Fox Networks Group
 A&E Networks
 TV18
 Sony Corporation
 BBC Studios
 Living Media
 ABP Group
 CNBC Asia
 ITV Network
 Amitabh Bachchan Corporation
 NDTV
 Excel Entertainment
 Network18 Group
 Sahara India Pariwar
 Zee Media Corporation
 TV Today Network
 Essel Group
 NBCUniversal
 Prasar Bharati
 Sony Pictures Sports Network
 Paramount Global
 Star Sports India

Indonesia

Iran

 AFN TV
 Amoozesh TV Network
 Andisheh TV
 Appadana International
 Arya TV
 Azadi TV
 Azarbayjan-e Gharbi TV
 Azarbayjan-e Sharghi TV
 Baran TV
 Channel One
 Channel Two
 Didar Global TV
 EBC.1
 Esfahan TV
 Face1 Persia
 Fars TV
 Jaam-e Jam International
 IPN
 Call Shop TV
 Channel 1
 Channel 2
 Channel 3
 Channel 4
 Farsi 1
 GALA TV
 Gem TV
 King TV
 Tehran TV
 Homa TV
 IRINN
 Iranian Cinema Channel
 Iran Music
 ITN1
 ITN2
 IRIB Quran
 IRIB World Service
 Jaam-e Jam
 Jame-Jam TV Network 1
 Jame-Jam TV Network 2
 Jame-Jam TV Network 3
 Kerman TV
 Khorasan TV
 Khozestan TV
 Live Channel
 Markazi TV
 Mazandaran TV
 Mohajer International TV
 MTC
 Nejat TV
 New Channel TV
 OITN
 Omid-e-Iran OITN
 PBC
 Tapesh
 Tapesh 2 Music Channel
 Press TV
 Pars TV
 Payam TV
 PEN
 PMC
 Persian News Network (PNN)
 Rang-a-Rang TV
 Sahar (TV station)
 Salaam TV
 Simaye Azadi Iran National TV
 Tamasha International Network
 VoA TV Persian
 Yazd TV
 Your TV

Iraq

 Rudaw Media Network – Rudaw.net
Speda Tv - Speda.net
 Waar TV
 Ahlulbayt Satellite Channel – Ahlulbayt.tv
 Al-Baghdadia TV
 Al Babilya TV
 Al Fayhaa TV
 Al Furat TV
 Al Iraqiya (Iraqi Media Network)
 Al Iraqiya 2
 Al Iraqiya 3 Sports
 Al Hurria TV
 Al Mirbad TV
 Al Nahrain TV (IMN Southern Region)
 Al Nasr TV
 Al Qiethara Satellite Channel
 Al Rafiden TV
 Al Sharqiya
 Al Sumaria
 Al Shaabya
 AldiyarSat
 Al Forat Network
 Al-Masar TV
 Al-Rafidaen TV
 Al-Zawraa TV
 Ashur TV
 Baghdad Satellite Channel
 Beladi TV
 Ishtar TV
 Karbala TV
 Sana TV
 Alahad TV
 Aletejah TV
 Asia Network Television
 STAR TV (Satellite Television for Asian Region Iraq)
 Channel [V] India
 Channel [V] International
 Fox News Channel
 Fox Sports
 ITV Choice
 Jetix
 Nat Geo Adventure Iraq
 National Geographic Adventure Iraq
 Sky News
 Star Movies
 Star News
 Star World
 Türkmeneli TV

Ireland

Most channels from the United Kingdom are available in Ireland.

 Animal Planet Ireland
 BBC Northern Ireland
 Bloomberg TV Europe
 Boomerang Europe
 Cartoon Network
 3e – independent station
 Channel 9 – Community channel in Derry
 City Channel – independent station in Dublin
 CNBC Europe
 CNN International (Europe/MiddleEast/Africa)
 Cúla 4 – Irish speaking children's channel
 Discovery Channel Ireland
 E4
 EuroNews
 Eurosport
 Fox TV
 MGM Movies IRL
 National Geographic Channel Europe
 NVTV – Community channel in Belfast (Northern Visions Television)
 RLO TV
 Raidió Teilifís Éireann (RTÉ) – Public Service broadcaster 
 RTÉ One
 RTÉ2 (Not RTÉ Two)
 RTÉ News Now
 RTÉjr
 Setanta Sports 1
 Setanta Sports 2
 Setanta Sports Golf
 Setanta Sports Ireland
 Setanta Sports News
 Sky (BSkyB – satellite network)
 Sky Cinema
 Sky1
 Sky Sports
 TG4 (Irish language semi-independent station)
 TMC Europe
 Viacom Ireland
 MTV Rocks
 MTV Base
 MTV Dance
 MTV Hits
 MTV
 Nick Jr.
 Nickelodeon Ireland
 Paramount Comedy Ireland
 VH1
 VH1 Classic (Replaced by MTV Classic)
 Virgin Media Television
 Virgin Media One – independent station 
 Virgin Media Two – independent station 
 Virgin Media Three – independent station 
 UTV – part of the ITV network
note: BBC NI and UTV are based in Northern Ireland, RTÉ and Virgin Media Television in the Ireland. However all four are available to most viewers throughout the island of Ireland, with UTV now accepting advertising from the Republic and targeting some of its programmes specifically at viewers in the Republic. Access to the Republic's stations (but in particular TG4) in Northern Ireland was a requirement of the Good Friday Agreement peace deal in 1998, but this has yet to be fully implemented (mainly due to frequency spectrum issues).

Israel

Italy

Ivory Coast

 La Première – (Radiodiffusion Television Ivoirienne RTI)
 TV2 – (Radiodiffusion Television Ivoirienne RTI)
 TAM-TAM TV – (Private TV)
 Metro TV
 MTV Ivory Coast (MTV Ivorian Public Music Channel)
 MTV Base Africa
 TV1
 TV2
 TV3
 TV24
 RTB Perdana (Formerly RTB1)
 France 24
 TFX (Formerly NT1)

Jamaica

Japan

 NHK (Nippon Hōsō Kyōkai)
 NHK General TV
 NHK Educational TV
 Nippon News Network (NNN)/Nippon TV
 Japan News Network (JNN)/TBS
 Fuji News Network (FNN)/Fuji TV
 All-Nippon News Network (ANN)/TV Asahi
 TV Tokyo Network (TXN)/TV Tokyo
 Japanese Association of Independent Television Stations (JAITS)

Jordan

 Al Hakeka TV
 AldiyarSat
 ATV (Al Ghad Television)
 DJ Music TV
 JRTV (Al Ordoniyah)
 Mersal TV
 Moon Sat TV
 Smarts Way Channel
 STAR TV (Satellite Television for Asian Region Jordan)
 Channel [V] India
 Channel [V] International
 Fox News Channel
 Fox Sports
 ITV Choice
 Jetix
 Nat Geo Adventure Jordan
 National Geographic Adventure Jordan
 Sky News
 Star Movies
 Star News
 Star One
 Star Plus
 Star World
 Super Tech TV
 WTV (Watan TV)
 Josat TV
 Toyor al Jannah
 Toyor baby
 Amman TV
 Al-Mamlaka
 Al-Faisaly TV
 One Sports

Kazakhstan

 CaspioNet
 Astana
 Channel 1 Russia & Eurasia
 Channel One Eurasia
 Channel 31
 Khabar TV
 KTK (Kommerceskiyi Televizioniyi Kanal)
 NTK-TV
 Hit tv
 Rakhat TV
 Kazakhstan 1
 Viacom Russia
 Nickelodeon Russia
 MTV Russia
 MTV2
 Muzzone
 Tantv

Kenya

 Citizen TV
 Family TV Kenya
 KBC (Kenya Broadcasting Corporation)
 Kenya Live TV
 KTN (Kenya Television Network)
 NTV Kenya
 UTV
 Three (New Zealand)
 Brainsworth TV
 QTV
 Kiss TV
 GBS (Good News Broadcasting System)
 Sayare TV (Sauti Ya Rehema)
 Kass TV
 Inooro TV
 K24
 Ebru TV
 Ramogi TV
 Maisha Magic East
 Youth TV
 Kameme TV
 Youth TV
 Switch TV

Kiribati

 Kiribati TV
 Sky Pacific

North Korea

 Kaesong Television
 Korean Central Television (KCTV)
 
  (MBS)

South Korea

 KBS
 SBS
 EBS
 MBC

Kosovo

 Radio Television of Kosovo

Kurdistan

 AsoSat
 Badinan Sat
 Çira TV
 Gali Kurdistan
 Hawler TV
 Jamawar Kurdistan
 Kanal 4
 KNN TV
 Kirkuk TV
 Komala TV
 Komar TV
 Korek TV
 Kurd 1
 Kurd Channel
 Kurdistan TV
 KurdMax
 KurdMax Pepule
 Kurdistan Parliament Channel
 Kurdsat
 Med Muzik
 Med Nûçe
 Newroz TV
 NRT TV
 NRT 2
 Pelistank TV
 Payam TV
 Roj TV
 Rojhelat TV
 Ronahi TV
 Rudaw TV
 Speda TV
 Sterk TV
 Tishk TV
 Vin TV
 Waar TV
 Zagros TV
 Zaro TV
 Zarok TV

Kuwait

 Al Mishkat Channel
 Al Naser Club
 Alafasy TV
 Alrai TV
Al-Watan TV
 Al-Resalah Satellite TV
 Bahry TV
 Channel 4 Teen
 Geo TV Middle East
 Ghiras TV
 KTV (Kuwait Television)
 KTV1 Kuwait
 KTV2 Kuwait
 KTV3 Kuwait
 KTV4 Kuwait
 Kuwait Space Channel
 Layalina TV
 Qubat Al Parlaman Channel
 STAR TV (Satellite Television for Asian Region Kuwait)
 Channel [V] India
 Channel [V] International
 Fox News Channel
 Fox Sports
 ITV Choice
 Jetix
 Nat Geo Adventure Kuwait
 National Geographic Adventure Kuwait
 Sky News
 Star Movies
 Star News
 Star World
 Taiba TV

Kyrgyzstan

 KOORT (Kyrgyz Television)
 KTR (Kyrgyz Television)
 Mezon TV (Kyrgyz Regional Television)
 NBT (Kyrgyz Television)
 EL TR (Kyrgyz Television)
 OSH TV (Kyrgyz Regional Television)
 OSH3000 TV (Kyrgyz Regional Television)
 Star TV (Satellite Television for Asian Region Kyrgyzstan)
 Channel [V] International
 Fox News Channel
 Nat Geo Adventure
 National Geographic Channel Kyrgyzstan
 Sky News
 Star Movies
 Star World
 TV Piramida (Kyrgyz Television)

Laos

 LNTV (Lao National TV)

Latvia

Lebanon

 Al Jadeed
 Al Jadeed Local
 Al Jadeed Sat
 Al Jadeed USA & Australia
 Al Manar
 Al Manar Terrestrial
 Al Manar Sat
 Al Mayadeen News TV
 Al-Zahra TV
 ATC (Arab Tourism Channel)
 City Broadcasting Network
 City Mix
 City Movies
 City Series
 City Drama
 City Kids
 City Lifestyle
 City Premiere
 City News
 City Sport 1
 City Sport 2
 ETV (Entertainment TV)
 Fashion TV Arabiya (Ceased)
 Future TV
 Future TV Terrestrial
 Future TV International
 Future TV America & Australia
 Future News (Ceased)
 Zёn TV (Ceased)
 Heya TV
 Rotana
 LBC Sat
 Lebanese Broadcasting Corporation
 LBC Europe
 LBC America
 LBC Australia
 LBC Sub Saharian Africa
 LBC WOW (Ceased)
 LBC Plus (Ceased)
 LBC C33 (Ceased)
 LBC Nagham Lebanese Broadcasting Corporation Nagham (Ceased)
 LBCI
 LBCI Drama
 LBCI News
 LBCI HD
 LDC
 Mlive
 Morico TV Shopping (Ceased)
 MTC (Music Time Channel)(Ceased)
 Murr Television
 Murr Television Local
 Murr Television Al Loubnaniya (Sat)
 Murr Television HD
 National Broadcasting Network
 Orange TV
 Télé Liban
 Télé Liban Terrestrial
 Télé Liban Sat
 Charity TV
 Télé Lumière
 Noursat
 Noursat Shabab
 Noursat Kids

Plus, a wide variety of pay television channels from Orbit Showtime, ADD, Cablevision, Econet, Digitek...

Lesotho 

 LTV (Lesotho Television)
 PHCL Christian TV

Liberia

 Liberia Broadcasting System (LBS)
 LNTV Liberia
Power TV
Super TV
KMTV
PUNCH TV
Strong TV

Libya

 Libya TV
 Libya Alhurra TV
 Libya Awalan TV
 Alnabaa
 218TV
 218TV News
 Libya One
 Libya Alrsmia
 Libya Sport Channel
 Libya 24
 Libya One
 Libya AlHadath
 Libya News
 Libya Alquran
 Libya Panorama
 Libya Kids

Liechtenstein

Lithuania

 Lietuvos rytas TV
 LRT televizija
 LRT Plius
 LNK
 BTV
 TV6
 TV1
 TV3
 Info TV
 2TV
 TV8
 LRT Lituanica

Luxembourg

 Astra HDTV
 Astra Mosaic
 Chamber TV – owned by Chambre des Députés in Luxembourgish and French 
 DOK – a nationwide public access channel 
 FilmBox Russia
 Footschool TV
 Hallmark Channel Scandilux
 Liberty TV
 Luxe.tv
 NFM-TV News, Fashion & Music
 Nordliicht TV – a regional programme for the North of Luxembourg 
 RTL Group
 RTL Zwee – owned by RTL Group in Luxembourgish
 RTL4 – owned by RTL Group in Dutch 
 RTL5 – owned by RTL Group in Dutch 
 RTL7 – owned by RTL Group in Dutch 
 RTL8 – owned by RTL Group in Dutch 
 RTL Zwei – owned by RTL Group in German 
 RTL Télé Lëtzebuerg – owned by RTL Group in Luxembourgish 
 RTL Television – owned by RTL Group in German 
 Super RTL – owned by RTL Group in German 
 DPG Media & Groupe Rossel
 Club RTL – owned by DPG Media & Groupe Rossel in French 
 RTL TVI – owned by DPG Media & Groupe Rossel in French 
 Mediawan Thematics
 RTL9 – owned by Mediawan Thematics in French 
 Channel 21 Holding AG
 Channel 21 - owned by Channel 21 Holding AG in German
 Satmode
 Tele 2
 TDC
 Uelzecht Kanal – a regional programme for Esch-Uelzecht

North Macedonia

 Alsat M (Albanian-language TV channel)
 Balkanika Music TV
Cartoon Network RSEE
Disney Channel Europe
 FilmBox Extra
 BOM (Best of Macedonia)
 BTR Sat (roma-language TV channel broadcasting in Skopje)
 Channel 5 (third most watched channel who got the national concession just in 2005)
 K-15 TV
 MKTV Sat
 FilmBox Plus
 MTV – Parliament Channel
 VH1 and MTV2 (the national channels, until 2003–2004 MTV2 used to be just about the same like MTV1 and the Parliament Channel used to be titled MTV3 and was intended for the minorities living in Macedonia. Back in 2003–2004 MTV3 transformed into MTV2 and MTV2 was retitled as Parliament Channel, having broadcast only the National Parliament discussions).
 MTV Adria
Nickelodeon Europe
 Orbis TV (local TV station from Bitola)
 FilmBox Premium
 SITEL (second most watched channel)
 Telma (Telma is fourth privately owned national channel in R. of Macedonia)
 TV Koha Macedonia (Albanian-language TV channel)
 TV Sutel (roma-language TV channel broadcasting in Skopje)
 TV Intel Strumica
 Timeless Drama Channel

Macau

In 1-flagship free-to-air terrestrial television stations and 2-flagship analog free-to-air terrestrial television channels in Hong Kong such
 Teledifusão de Macau (TDM; 澳門廣播電視股份有限公司 (澳門廣播電視, 澳門廣視)) is a Macau flagship free-to-air terrestrial television stations and 2-flagship analog free-to-air terrestrial television channels in Macau such:
 TDM-1 (澳視1台華文頻道) in Cantonese flagship free-to-air terrestrial television channel on UHF in normally tuned to 30 by the analog & 91 by the digital.
 TDM-2 (澳視2台葡文頻道) in Portuguese flagship free-to-air terrestrial television channel on UHF in normally tuned to 32 by the analog & 92 by the digital.

Premium channels

 Macau Asia Satellite Television (MASTV) 澳亞衛視
 Lotus TV Macau (LOTUS) 澳門蓮花衞視
 Fung Fu Television (FFTV) 功夫衛視
 China Satellite Television (CSTV) 中華衛視
 NewSky Satellite Television (NewSky) 新天衛視
 Confucius Television (KZTV) 孔子衛視

Madagascar

 MaTV (Maeva 7 TV)
 MBS (Malagasy Broadcasting System)
 RTA (Radio Television Analamanga)
 TVM (TeleViziona Malagasy)
 TVF (Televiziona Fialamboly)
 OTV
 Viva (Viva television)
 Record (Radio television record)

Malawi

 Malawi Broadcasting Corporation
 Prophetic Channel
 Times Television
 Mibawa Television
 Zodiac Television
 Mzati Television
 Luntha Television
 GBS Television
 Angaliba Television
 Timveni Television
 Joy Television
 Rainbow Television
 ABC Television
 Islamic  Television
 MDBL Television

Malaysia

 Radio Televisyen Malaysia (RTM)
 TV1
 TV2
 TV Okey
 Berita RTM
 Sukan RTM
 TV6 (currently in trial phase)
 RTM Parlimen (not available on over-the-air television, but broadcasts on RTM Klik with 2 channels)
 Media Prima Berhad
 TV3
 NTV7 
 Didik TV KPM (a joint-venture channel with Ministry of Education Malaysia)
 8TV
 TV9
 Drama Sangat
 WOW Shop Malay
 WOW Shop Mandarin
 Alhijrah Media Corporation
 TV Alhijrah
 Astro Malaysia Holdings (satellite and IPTV provider)
 Malay Channels
 Astro Ria
 Astro Prima
 Astro Oasis
 Astro Warna
 Astro Citra
 Astro Ceria
 Astro Awani
 GO Shop Baaru (also available on over-the-air television)
 GO Shop Ruuma
 GO Shop Gaaya
 Astro Arena
 Astro Arena 2
 Chinese Channels
 Astro AEC
 Astro Shuang Xing
 Astro Quan Jia HD
 Astro Hua Hee Dai
 Astro Xiao Tai Yang
 Astro AOD (including 4 channels and a high-definition channel)
 GO Shop Mandarin (also known as 'GO Shop 2')
 Indian Channels (Tamil/Hindi)
 Astro Vaanavil 
 Astro Vinmeen HD
 Astro Vellithirai
 Astro Box Office Movies Thangathirai
 Astro Box Office BollyOne HD (programs are Hindi language, but serve in English-language as the continuity)
 English Channels
 PRIMEtime
 Showcase Movies
 TA-DAA!
 eGG Network
 Astro SuperSport
 Astro SuperSport 2
 Astro SuperSport 3
 Astro SuperSport 4
 Astro SuperSport 5
 Astro Cricket
 Other Channels
 Astro Tutor TV SK
 Astro Tutor TV SMK
 Astro UHD
 Awesome Media Networks Sdn Bhd
 Awesome TV
 DNF Group Sdn Bhd
 SUKE TV
 SUKE SHOP
 Malaysian National News Agency
 Bernama TV
 Sarawak Media Group Sdn Bhd
 TVS 
 Telekom Malaysia Berhad (Unifi TV) (IPTV provider)
 Dunia Sinema
 HyppInspirasi
 HyppSensasi
 LAKU Mall
 Parlimen Malaysia
 Pesona
 Hypp Salam
 unifi Sports 1
 unifi Sports 2
 unifi Sports 3
 unifi Sports 4
 unifi Sports 5

Maldives

 VTV
 DhiTV
 TVM
 PSM News
 Munnaaru TV
 Raajje TV
 Sun TV
 DhiPlus
 SanguTV HD
 Sangu E
 Channel 13
 Channel One
 Channel 9
 D 24
 MVTV
 Al`Kaun
 Majlis
 ICE TV
 Next TV
 YES TV

Mali

 Africable Network
 ORTM (Office de Radiodiffusion-Television du Mali)

Malta

TVMNews+
TVM
One News
Net News

Marquesas Islands

 See: Telecommunications in Marquesas Islands

Marshall Islands

 MBC-TV (Marshall Broadcasting Company)

Martinique

 ATV (Antilles Television)
 Tempo
 RFO Télé Martinique
 Canal+ Antilles
 KMT (Kanal Matinik television)

Mauritania

 TVM (TV de Mauritanie)
 Nessma TV

Mauritius

MBC Digital 1 (MBC1)
MBC Digital 2 (MBC2)
MBC Digital 3 (MBC3)
 BTV
MBC Digital 8 (BBC World)
France 24
Kids Channel
YSTV 
Ciné 12 
 MBC Digital 13
 MBC Digital 14
 MBC Digital 15
 MBC Digital 16
 MBC Digital 17
 MBC Digital 18

Mayotte

 Tempo
 RFO Télé Mayotte
 MTV Base Africa
 MTV Europe
 France 4
 France 24
 France 5
 TF1 Mayotte
 TF1
 MTV Hits
 MTV Music
 TFX

Mexico

Over-the-air

National TV Broadcast
Azteca 7 – generalsit also in HD
Azteca Uno – generalist also in HD
A+ – generalist also in SD
ADN 40 – News Channel
Canal 5 – generalist also in HD
Canal 22 – cultural also in HD
Las Estrellas – generalist also in HD
Forotv – News Channel
 Ingenio TV – cultural
Nu9ve- generalist also in HD
 Once TV México – generalist also in HD
 Once Ninos – cartoons
 TVU teveunam – cultural
Canal Catorce – cultural also in HD
Milenio TV – News Channel
Excelsior TV – News Channel
Multimedios – Generalist also in HD

Federated States of Micronesia

 KPON 7 Kolonia (Pohnpei)
 TTKK 7 Moen (Truk)
 WAAB 7 Colonia (Yap)

Midway Islands
 KMTH-TV (AFRTS, Midway Island)

Moldova

Monaco

 Monaco Info – local station 
 TMC – commercial station

Mongolia

 Mongolian National Broadcaster (MNB)
 Ulaanbaatar Broadcasting System (UBS)
 Edutainment TV (Боловсрол суваг)
 Eagle TV
 C1 (Channel One)
 NTV
 SBN (Supervision Broadcasting Network)
 MN25
 TV5
 TV8
 TV9
 TM TV (Танин Мэдэхүйн ТВ)
 BTV (Б цэг)
 Эх орон ТВ (Motherland TV)
 Parliament TV (Парламентын суваг)
 Mongol HD TV (МонголТВ)
 Ett3 HD TV (эттэ ТВ)

Montenegro

Montserrat

 Antilles TV Channel 7, Plymouth, Montserrat/Chance Pic, Montserrat
 ZJB-TV 13, (ABS-TV), Plymouth, Montserrat
 BBC World News

Morocco

 Al Aoula HD1 TDT (Laayoune TV) (Al Aoula Europe) (Al Aoula Middle East) (Al Aoula Maroc)
 2M National SD2 TDT (2M Monde) (2M Middle East)
 Arryadia HD3 TDT (Arryadia 2)
 Arrabiâ HD4 TDT (Arrabiâ Thakafia)
 Maghribia HD5 TDT (Maghribia America)
 Assadissa HD6 TDT
 Assabiaa HD7 TDT
 Tamazight HD8 TDT
 Chada HD9 TDT
 MediaSat HD10 TDT
 Disney Maroc TDT
 MFMRadio Televisión TDT
 MarsRadio Televisión TDT
 MedRadio Televisión TDT
 HitRadio Televisión TDT
 AswatRadio Televisión TDT
 MFMRadio Televisión TDT
 CapRadio Televisión TDT
 MedinaFM Televisión TDT
 AtlanticRadio Televisión TDT
 Télé Maroc 11HD
 Canal Atlas
 Hespress TV
 Hiba press TV
 alyaoum24
 Febrayr TV
 Le360 TV
 NejmaTV
 Space Toon Maroc
 Toyor Aljanah
 MBC 1
 MBC 2
 MBC 3
 MBC 4
 MBC 5
 MBC Max
 MBC Action
 Rotana Kids
 Rotana Clip
 Rotana Music
 Rotana Drama
 Rotana Comedy
 B4U Aflam
 Zee Alwan
 Zee Aflam
 ART Hekayat 1
 ART Aflam 2
 ART Movies 3
 Fox Arabe
 Fox Crime
 Fox Movies
 Star Movies
 Sky News Arabe
 BBC Arabe
 CNBC Arabe
 KTV & Arabe
 Al-Majd Quran
 Al Ons TV
 L'Match TV
 Sorec TV TV
 Sloog TV
 Chouftv
 Arryadia 2
 2M Soread (Canal + 2M Soread)(Canal + Sport2)(Canal + Sport3)(Piwi +)(TéléToon +)(Canal J Maroc)(Disney Junior)(Tiji Maroc)
 Al Aoula (Comedy Central)(Mickelodeon)(History 1)(History 2)(MTV Hits Maroc)(MTV Maroc)(National Geographic Maroc)(National Geographic Wild Maroc) 
 Medi1 SAT (Gulli Arabe)(CN Arabe)(Boing Maroc)(Boomerang Maroc)(Medi1TV Français) (Medi1TV Maghreb) (Medi1TV Arabic) (Medi1TV News English)
 Map National 12HD4 TDT (M24 TV)(Canal Maghreb 1HD)(Canal Maghreb 2HD)(GM Alwan HD)(GM Chaabi SD)(GM Music HD)(GM Movies HD)(GMTV is Grand Maghreb)
 MFMRadio Televisión TDT (Al Fallah TV)(MFM Sport)(Lalla Fatema TV)(VH TV Officiel TV)(Challenge Maroc Officiel TV)
 MarsRadio Televisión TDT (Cote & Sport 1)(Cote & Sport 2)(Cote & Sport)(Foot +)
 HitRadio Televisión TDT (Hit Gold)(Hit CoverTV)(Hit LatinoTV)(Hit FrenchTV)(Hit MaghribTV)
 MedRadio Televisión TDT (Med Sport) (Kifache TV)
 CapRadio Televisión TDT (CAP24 TV)

Mozambique

 TVM (Mozambique Television Network)
 ZAP Novelas

Myanmar

 Democratic Voice of Burma (DVB)
 MRTV (Myanmar Television)
 MRTV-2 (Myanmar Television 2)
 MRTV-3 (Myanmar Television 3)
 MRTV-4 (Myanmar Television 4)
 Myanmar International Television (MITV)
 Myawady TV (MWD TV)
 Myawady Movies
 Myawady Series
 Myawady Variety
 Myawady Music
 Myawady Documentary
 Myawady Shopping
 MTV Asia
 Buddha
 Mizzima TV
 BTV Myanmar

Namibia

 NBC (Namibian Broadcasting Corporation)
 ONE – Africa Television

Nauru

 NTV (Nauru Television)

Nepal

 Galaxy 4K Television
 ABC Television
 Business Television Nepal BizTV
 Prime Times Television
 AP1 Television
 Avenues TV
 Channel Nepal
 Image Channel
 Kantipur Television
 Nepal Television
Nickelodeon India
 NTV News
 NTV PLUS
 Nepal 1
 Sagarmatha Television
 Terai Television
 National (Nepal TV channel)
 News 24 (Nepal)
 E24 Nepal
 Mountain Television
 Himalaya Television
 GopiKrishna TV Filmy

Netherlands

In the Netherlands, the television market is divided between a number of commercial networks and a system of public broadcasters sharing three channels.

 Netherlands Public Broadcasting:
 NPO 1
 NPO 2
 NPO 3
 From RTL Nederland:
 RTL 4
 RTL 5
 RTL 7
 RTL 8
 RTL Z
 From Talpa:
 Net5
 SBS6
 Veronica
 SBS9

Netherlands Antilles

 A-TiVi
 FBN (Flamingo Broadcasting Network)
 Grand Hotel Casino
 LBC (Leeward Broadcasting Corporation)
 TeleCuracao TV8
 TeVeSur (Nederland)

New Caledonia

 Canal+ Caledonie
 MTV Caledonie
 France Ô
 RFO Télé Nouvelle Calédonie

New Zealand

Most channels from Australia are available in New Zealand.

National Channels
 TVNZ 1
 TVNZ 2
 Three
 Bravo
 Māori Television
 TVNZ 1 Plus 1
 TVNZ 2 Plus 1
 Three Plus 1
 Bravo Plus 1
 Prime
 The Edge
 ChoiceTV
 TVNZ Duke
 Te Reo
 Parliament TV

Local Channels
 Channel North Television
 TVHB
 CTV
 CUE
 Channel 39
 45 South TV
 TV Rotorua
 tvCentral
 TV33
 TRACKSIDE
 Face TV
 The SKY Network

Nicaragua

National channels
 Televicentro (Canal 2)
 Canal 4
 Telenica (Canal 8)
 Canal 10
 ESTV (Canal 11)
 Magic Channel
 Nicavisión (Canal 12)
 100% Noticias, El Canal
 Enlace Nicaragua (Canal 21)
 CDNN 23
 atv98

Local channels
 Bluefields Channel 5
 Boacovisión Canal 11
 Jalapa Canal 3
 Jinotega Canal 3
 León Canal 55
 Matagalpa Canal 8
 Ocotal Channel 11
 Rivas Canal 7
 San Isidro-La Trinidad-Condega Canal 6
 Somoto Canal 13
 Telenorte Canal 35 
 Waslala Channel 3

Niger

 Tal TV
 Tele Sahel
 Bonferey
 Radio Television Tenere
 Dounia TV
 Radio Television Labari

Nigeria

Niue

 NBN (Niue Broadcasting Network)

Northern Mariana Islands

 WSZE 10 (Saipan, Northern Marianas Islands)

Norway

 Viasport 3
 Viasport +
 Viasport
 Hallmark Channel Scandilux
 Metropol TV
 Moox Live
 MTV Nordic (Replaced by MTV Norway)
Nickelodeon Scandinavia
 NRK
 NRK1
 NRK2
 NRK3
 NRK Super
 NRK Tegnspråk
 Nyhetskanalen
 Rikstoto Direkte
 Silver HD
 SportN
 National Geographic Channel Norge
 Tippeliga
 The Voice TV Norge
 TV Norge
 VOX
 FEM
 TV2 Filmkanalen
 TV 2 (Norway)
 TV2 Nyhetskanalen
 TV2 Sport
 TV2 Sport 1
 TV2 Sport 2
 TV2 Zebra
 TV3 Norge
 TV4 Norge
 Verdikanalen
 Viasat 4
 Viasat Plus
 Visjon Norge
 ZTV Norge

Oman

 Oman TV
 Majan Channel

Pakistan

Palau

 OTV (Oceania Television)  (Koror, Palau)

Palestine

 PSC (Palestinian Satellite Channel)
 Ma'an (Palestinian Authority)
 Al-Aqsa TV (Hamas)
 Awda TV  (Fatah)
 Al-Quds Al-Yawm (Islamic Jihad)
 Filastin Al-Yawm (allegedly Islamic Jihad)

Panama

 RPC TV Canal 4
 TVN Canal 2
 Telemetro Canal 13
 FETV Canal 5
 SERTV Canal 11
 TVMax Canal 9
 NexTV Canal 21
 OYE TV
 +23 Canal 23 (Music video channel)
 Enlace Canal 29
 NexTV Canal 33 (mirroring signal from NexTV)
 Plus Canal 35
 Hosana Visión Canal 37
 QEXTV La Exitosa Canal 27
 Asamblea Nacional TV
 Canal Geek
 ATV Panamá
 Canal TV
 SCN 8 (Former, Panama Canal Zone TV station, first in Panama opening in 1956, closed on December 31, 1999, with the dissolution of the Canal Zone)

Papua New Guinea

 EM TV
 ESPN Papua New Guinea
 Fox News Channel
 Nat Geo Adventure Papua New Guinea
 National Geographic Channel Papua New Guinea
 National Television Service (NTS)
 Star Movies
 Star Sports
 Star World

Paraguay

 Canal 13
 LaTele
 Paraguay TV
 C9N
 Paravisión
 SNT
 Telefuturo
 MTV Latin America
 MTV Hits Latin America
Nickelodeon Latin America
 Sur Tv
 Unicanal

Peru

 América Televisión
 Andina de Televisión
 Austral TV
 Bethel TV
 Canal N
 MTV Latin America
Nickelodeon Latin America
 Movistar Televisión network
 Latina Televisión
 Huascaran TV
 MundoVision
 PACFC - Pacifico Comunicaciones (Canal 42)
 PAXTV - Pax TV (Canal 17)
 Panamericana TV
 TeleJuan
 TV Peru

Philippines

Major Television Networks
ABS-CBN (now defunct)
 A2Z
GMA Network
TV5

Government-owned television networks
 Intercontinental Broadcasting Corporation (IBC)
 People's Television Network (PTV) (flagship state broadcaster)
 Radio Philippines Network (RPN) (20% minority share; currently carries CNN Philippines)

Minor television networks
 All TV (formerly known as AMBS)
  PIE Channel (formerly known as BEAM TV)
 Net 25
 RJTV
 UNTV

Pitcairn Islands

 BBC World News
 CNN
 Turner Classic Movies

Poland

Portugal

Puerto Rico

Qatar

 Al Jazeera
 Al Jazeera Children's Channel
 Al Jazeera English
 Al Jazeera Mobasher
 Al Jazeera Sports +1
 Al Jazeera Sports +2
 Al Jazeera Sports 2
 Al Jazeera Sports Channel
 Alkass
 Al-Waha TV
 Arab Business Channel
 Geo TV Middle East
 Qatar TV
 Zee Entertainment Enterprises (Zee Network Asia))
 Zee TV
 Zing
 Zee Bollywood
 Zee ETC Bollywood
 Zee Tamil
 Zee Telugu
 Zee Anmol
 STAR TV (Satellite Television for Asian Region Qatar)
 Channel [V] India
 Channel [V] International
 Fox News Channel
 Fox Sports
 ITV Choice
 Jetix
 Nat Geo Adventure Qatar
 National Geographic Adventure Qatar
 Sky News
 Star Movies
 Star News
 Star World

Réunion

 Antenne Reunion
 Canal+ Réunion
 France 1
 France 2
 France 3
 France 4
 France 5
 France Ô
 TF1 Réunion
 TF1
 TFX
 MTV Réunion
 MTV Europe
 MTV Hits Réunion
 MTV Hits Africa
 MTV Base Africa
 MTV Base Europe
 Kanal Austral
 RFO Télé Reunion

Romania

Russia

Rwanda

 Rwanda Television
 TV 10
 TV1
 BTN TV Rwanda

Saba

 PJF-TV 3 (LBC)
 PJB-TV 6 (Tele Curaçao)
 PJS-TV 6 (LBC)
 RCTV 10
 PJF-TV 11 (ABC, Saba)

Saint Barthélemy

 France Inter
 RFO Radio Guadeloupe
 Radio Saint Barth
 Radio Transat

Saint Kitts and Nevis

 ZIZ-TV 2 and 5, Basseterre
 BBC World News
 Nevis Television

Saint Lucia

 National Television Network (NTN 2) – Saint Lucia
 HTS Channel 4, Castries, Saint Lucia
 HTS Channel 5
 EWTN Channel 6, Castries, Saint Lucia
 HTS Channel 11, Castries, Saint Lucia
 TBN Channel 13, Castries, Saint Lucia
 STV
 Daher Broadcasting Service, DBS
 Choice News Network
 MBC Television
 HOT 7 TV
 Calabash TV

Sint Maarten

 LBC (Leeward Broadcasting Corporation)
 MSR-TV (Channel 9) 
. SXM TV15 (St. Maarten Cable TV-Channel 115)

Saint Pierre and Miquelon

 Tempo
 RFO Télé Saint-Pierre & Miquelon

Saint Vincent and the Grenadines

 Saint Vincent and the Grenadines Broadcasting Corporation (SVGBC)  – Saint Vincent and the Grenadines
 TBN Channel 4, Kingstown, Saint Vincent and the Grenadines
 SVG-TV Channels 7, 9, 10, 11, 13, 14, (CBS / CNN / Caribbean Media Corporation), Kingstown, Saint Vincent and the Grenadines
 BBC World News

Samoa
 CCTV-9
 TV3 Samoa
 EFKS-TV
 SBC TV1

San Marino

 Puntoshop
 TV San Marino
 RTV Sport

São Tomé and Príncipe

 RTP Africa
 TVS

Saudi Arabia

 Al Arabiya
 MBC 1
 MBC 2
 MBC 2 – English
 MBC 3
 MBC 3 - English
 MBC 4
 MBC 4 – English
 MBC Action
 MBC Action – English
 MBC MAX
 MBC MAX – English
 MBC Persia
 MBC Persia - English
 MBC FM
 MBC Panorama
Middle East Information
 Al Atheer TV
 Al Fajr Space Channel
 Al Mehwar TV
 Al Riyadiyah (Saudi Sports)
 Al Ekhbariya (Saudi News)
 Almajd TV Network
 (Manahij Ch.)
 Jeddah TV
 Osool
 Rotana Cinema
 Rotana Clip
 Rotana Khalijiah
 Rotana Musical Channel
 Rotana Tarab
 Rotana Zaman
 Saudi TV
 Saudi TV Channel 1
 Saudi TV Channel 2
 Al Ekhbariya
 Al-Riyadiah
 Seven Stars
 Shababiyah TV
 Zee Entertainment Enterprises (Zee Network Asia))
 Zee TV (Arabic)
 Zing (Hindi)
 Zee Cinema (Hindi)
 Zee ETC Bollywood (Hindi)
 Zee Tamil (Tamil)
 Zee Telugu (Telugu)
 Zee Anmol (Hindi)
 Localized versions of:
 Channel [V] India
 Channel [V] International
 Fox News Channel
 Fox Sports
 ITV Choice
 super movies
 Nat Geo Adventure Saudi Arabia
 National Geographic Adventure Saudi Arabia
 Sky News
 Star Movies
 Star News
 America plus

Senegal

 2s TV
 RTS (Radiodiffusion Télévision Sénégalaise)
 Walf TV
 RDV
TFM
l'obs

Serbia

Seychelles

 SBC (Seychelles Broadcasting Corporation)
 INTV One (Available on IntelVision Cable TV Service)
 Intelvision Cable TV
 TV5 Monde (Available on Analog Terrestrial and Intelvision Cable TV)

Sierra Leone

 KTV Sierra Leone
SLBC (Sierra Leone Broadcasting Corporation)
 African Young Voice Television
 STAR TV

Singapore

 Channel 5
 Channel 8
 Channel U
 CNA
 Suria
 Vasantham

Sint Eustatius
 RTV-7
 HOW-TV

Slovakia

 AXN Central Europe
 AXN Crime
 Cinemax Central Europe
 CineMax 2 Central Europe
 ETV Medicus
 Hallmark Channel Central Europe
 HBO Central Europe
 HBO 2 Central Europe
 HBO Comedy Central Europe
 Joj TV
 SPI Slovakia
 FilmBox
 Fast And Fun Box
 FilmBox Premium HD
 FilmBox Extra HD
 FilmBox Plus
 Gametoon
 FassionBox
 FilmBox Family
 FilmBox Arthouse
 DocuBox
 Timeless Drama Channel
 TV Markiza
 MGM Channel Central Europe
 Moooby-TV
 More 24
 Movies 24
 Movies 24+
 Music Box Slovakia
 MiniMax
 Nautik TV
 Nonstop Kino
 Nonstop Kino HD
 Ring TV
 Rozhlas a televízia Slovenska
 Jednotka
 Dvojka
 Sport 1 Czech Republic
 TA3
 TV Bratislava
 TV Patriot
 ZTV (Zilinska Televizia)

Slovenia

Solomon Islands

 TTV (Telekom Television)
TTV1
TTV2
TTV3
ABC Australia
BBC World
Al Jazeera
ESPN1
ESPN2
Edge Sport
DWTV
France24
CNA
CGTN
NHK
EWTN

Somalia

 GBC (Global Broadcasting Corporation)
 Shabelle TV
 STN North America
 STN (Somali TV Network)
 ETN (Eastern Television Network)
 HCTV (Horn Cable Television)
 SBC TV (Somali Broadcasting Corporation)
 SNTV (Somali National Television)
 Somaliland National TV
 Universal TV
 SOMNEWS TV Somali News Television ( Somalia)
 Somali Cable TV
 Saab TV

South Africa

 ABN (Adonai Broadcast Network)
 Action X (M-Net)
 Activate – A Mindset Channel
 ACtv – Africa Christian TV
 Africa Magic
 Afrisat TV
 AGN Global Access SA
 Al Jazeera
 7 AFRICA TV NETWORK
 Animal Planet Africa
 Animax (now defunct)
 Asianet Africa
 Boogaloos TV
 7 AFRICA TV NETWORK
 BBC Food
 BBC Prime
 BBC World News
 Bloomberg
 Boomerang
 7 AFRICA TV NETWORK
 7 AFRICA TV NETWORK
 Cartoon Network
 CCTV 4
 CCTV 9
 Channel O – Sound TV

 CNBC Africa
 7 AFRICA TV NETWORK
 MTV Base Africa
 MTV Africa
 CNN International
 Crime and Investigation Network
 Discovery Channel South Africa
 Discovery Historia
 Disney Channel

 E-TV
 E! Entertainment
 ERT
 ESPN
 Euro News
 Fashion TV
 Fin24
 Go
 Gospel Genesis
 History Channel South Africa
 Hallmark Channel
 IQRAA
 JCN (Judah Christian Network)
 K-TV World
 KykNet
 Manna TV
 Mindset Health
 Mindset Learn
 M-Net
 M-Net Movies 1
 M-Net Movies 2
 M-Net Series
 M-Net Stars
 MK
 MTV
 MTV Base
Nickelodeon Africa
Nick Jr. Africa
Nicktoons Africa
 National Geographic Channel South Africa
 News24
 One Gospel
 Orbicom Business TV
 Parliamentary Channel South Africa
 RAI International
 Rhema Network
 RTPi
 7 AFRICA TV NETWORK 7 Africa Tv Network is the first Christian culture television network in the world founder #Ofentse Tlou
 RT
 SABC (South African Broadcasting Corporation)
 SABC Africa
 SABC1
 SABC2
 SABC3
 SABC Education
 Setanta LiM Africa Sports Network
 Shoma (Education Foundation)
 Sky News
 Sony Entertainment Television
 Spirit Word Channel
 Style Network
 Summit TV
 SuperSport 1 ZA
 SuperSport 2 ZA
 SuperSport 3 ZA
 SuperSport 4 ZA
 SuperSport 5 ZA
 SuperSport 6 ZA
 SuperSport 7 ZA
 SuperSport 8 ZA
 TCM
 The Home Channel
 Travel Channel
 TBN Africa
 Telly Track
 The Block
 The Soap Channel
 University of Pretoria
 VH1
 Weather24
 Zone Reality
 Zee TV Africa

Spain

 RTVE (state-owned, nationwide)
 Mediaset España Comunicación (private, nationwide)
 Atresmedia (private, nationwide)
 FORTA (association of public regional broadcasting networks):
 Valencian Media Corporation
 Euskal Irrati Telebista
 Corporació Catalana de Mitjans Audiovisuals
 Radio y Televisión de Andalucía
 Compañía de Radio Televisión de Galicia
 Ente Público Radio Televisión Madrid
 Radio Televisión Canaria
 Radiotelevisión de Castilla-La Mancha
 Ens Públic de Radiotelevisió de les Illes Balears
 Corporación Aragonesa de Radio y Televisión
 Radiotelevisión del Principado de Asturias
 Radiotelevisión de la Región de Murcia
 Unidad Editorial (private, nationwide)

Sri Lanka

 Independent Television Network (ITN) State-owned Sinhala April 13, 1979
 Sri Lanka Rupavahini Corporation State-owned Sinhala February 15, 1982
 Sirasa TV Private Sinhala June 1998
 Channel One MTV Private English 1998
 TNL Private Sinhala / English 1993
 Swarnavahini Private Sinhala 1994
 ETV Private English 1995
 ART TV (Previously known as Dynavision) Private English 1996
 Shakthi TV Private Tamil 1998
 Nethra /Channel Eye State-owned Tamil / English 2000
 TV Lanka Private Sinhala 2001
 Derana Private Sinhala October 11, 2005
 Max TV Private Sinhala / English / Tamil January 17, 2007
 Udayam TV State-owned Tamil February 2008(Off Air)
 Vasantham TV (aka Wasanthan TV) State-owned Tamil June 25, 2009
 Siyatha TV Private Sinhala September 17, 2009
 Vettri TV Private Tamil September 17, 2009
 Prime TV State-owned English November 12, 2009
 TV2 Private English September 2008
 NTV State-owned English November 18, 2009

Satellite Networks

 TV international Private Sinhala 2001
 Srilakvahini Private Sinhala 2006
 The Buddhist Private Sinhala 2007
 Lakvision Private Sinhala 2008
 Channel C Private Sinhala 2007
 Lakroo Sinhala 2009
 Heritage TV Private Sinhala 2009
 Young Asia Television (YATV) Private Sinhala/English 2009
 DAN Tamiloli Private Tamil 2009
 Life TV Private Sinhala 2009

Sudan

 Al Shrouq TV
 Blue Nile TV
 Gutoof TV
 Sudan TV
 Zoal TV
 Goon TV
 Om Durman TV
 Kassala TV
 Khartoum TV
 Red Sea TV
 Alshamalia TV
 Algazira TV
 Almanal TV
 Alhilal TV
 Sudan Sport TV
 S24 TV
 New Africa TV

South Sudan

 Ebony TV
 Southern Sudan Television

Suriname

 ABC TV 4.1-4.2 Suriname
 Apintie TV 10.1
 ATV 12.1–12.4 – Algemene Televisie Verzorging (Telesur)
 Garuda TV 23.1–23.2
 Radika TV
 Ramasha TV
 RBN (Rapar Broadcasting Network)
 Sky TV
 Sookha TV
 STVS (Surinaamse Televisie Stichting)

Eswatini

 Channel Swazi

Sweden

Switzerland

 3 Plus TV Network
 Animax Deutschland
 Bunny X TV
 EBU Channel
 Euro 6 TV
 Eurosport Deutschland
 Eurosport 2 Deutschland
 Kabel 1 – private channel in German
 Koha Vision
 LoveNight TV
 MTV Schweiz – private music channel in German
 Redlight Germany
 RTL Group
 RTL 2 Schweiz
 RTL Shop
 Samanyolu TV Avrupa
 Sat.1 Schweiz – private channel in German
 Sensuality TV
 SRG SSR public Swiss television
 Schweizer Radio und Fernsehen – public television in German
 SRF 1
 SRF zwei
 SRF info
 Radio Télévision Suisse – public television in French
 RTS Un
 RTS Deux
 Radiotelevisione Svizzera – public television in Italian
 RSI La 1
 RSI La 2
 Radio e Television Rumantscha – public television in Romansh
 TvR
 SRG SSR Sat Access
 Star TV – private channel in German
 Star TV Switzerland
 Swisscable – trade association of cable service providers
 Tele Ticino – private channel in Italian
 Teleclub – pay TV in German
 TeleVeronika
 TV5 Monde France Belgique Suisse
 TVM3 – private music channel in French
 U1 TV – private channel in German
 VenusClub TV
 Viva Schweiz
 World Fashion Channel

Syria

 Addounia TV
 Al-Shaam TV
 Arabic Channel
 Arrai TV
 Massaya TV
 Noor Al-Sham
 Orient TV
 Sama TV
 Spacetoon
 Spacetoon English (defunct)
 STAR TV (Satellite Television for Asian Region Syria)
 Channel [V] India
 Channel [V] International
 Fox News Channel
 Fox Sports
 ITV Choice
 Jetix
 Nat Geo Adventure Syria
 National Geographic Adventure Syria
 Sky News
 Star Movies
 Star News
 Star World
 Syria Drama Channel
 Syria Education Channel
 Syria News Channel
 Syria TV
 Channel 1
 Syria Satellite Channel
 Talaqie TV
 Ugarit TV Latakia

Taiwan

Tajikistan
See: List of channels in Tajikistan
 TVT (Televidenye Tajikistana)
 TVS (TV Safina)
 TVB (TV Bakoristan)

Tanzania

 ATN (Agape Television Network)
 Channel 5 Tanzania
 Channel Ten
 ITV (Independent Television Limited)
 Star TV (Tanzania)
 TBC (Televisheni ya Taifa)
 Tv Iman
 CloudS TV
 Etv
 Wasafi TV

Thailand

 3HD (Digital TV Station owner by BEC-Multimedia and Since 2014)
 Royal Thai Army Radio and Television (TV5 HD)
 CH7HD
 MCOT HD30
 National Broadcasting Services of Thailand
 NBT Digital 2HD
 NBT Regional 11 (Consist of NBT North, NBT Northeast, NBT Central (Only one broadcast on HDTV) and NBT South)
 Thai Public Broadcasting Service 
 Thai PBS (HD 3)  (Formerly Known as ITV and TITV)
 ALTV (SD 4)
 T Sports (7) (Sports Authority of Thailand)
 TPTV10
 One(HD)31
 GMM 25
 Channel 8
 Nation TV
 JKN 18
 Thairath TV
 TNN16
 True4U
 Workpoint
 Mono 29
 Amarin TV
 PPTV HD36
 DLTV (Distance Learning Television:15 Channels)
 ETV (Educational Television Ministry of Education)
 VECTV (Owner by Office of the Vocational Education Commission)
 NBT World (Owner by National News Bureau of Thailand)
MTV Thailand
Nickelodeon Asia
Nick Jr. Asia
 Boomerang Thailand
 Cartoon Network Asia

Tibet
 Tibet People's Broadcasting Station

Timor-Leste

 Radio-Televisão Timor Leste

Togo

 TVT (Télévision Togolaise)
 Le Chaine Du Futur (LCF)
 NW Cinema
 NW Info
 NW Magazine
 NW Sport 1

Tokelau

 TBS (Tokelau Broadcasting System)
 LCF

Tonga

 Oceania Broadcasting Network
 Tonga Channel Systems
 Tonga1
 Tonga2
 Sky Pacific
 Television Tonga
 Tonfön Television

Trinidad and Tobago

 CCN TV6
Trinidad and Tobago Television
 Gayelle - The Channel
 Global TV

Tristan da Cunha

 Cable & Wireless
 BBC World News

Tunisia

Tunisia Nationale 1
Tunisia Nationale 2
 Hannibal-TV
 Nessma TV
Tunisna
Telvza TV
 Carthage+ TV
 Janoubia TV
M Tunisia
 Zaytouna TV
 Al insen TV
Al Hiwar Attounsi
 Al Moustakilla

Turkey

Turkmenistan

 Yaslyk
 TMT-3
 Türkmen Owazy
 Altyn Asyr
 TV4 Turkmenistan
 Miras

Turks and Caicos Islands

 WIV-TV Cable TV 4 Cable Television Services, Providenciales
 Turks & Caicos Television Cable Television Services, Grand Turk
 BBC World News
 SPI Turks & Caicos Islands
 Kino Polska International
 Timeless Drama Channel

Tuvalu

 TBC (Tuvaluan Broadcasting Company)

Uganda

 LTV (Lighthouse Television)
 Pulse Africa Television
 Record Television (run by the Universal Church of the Kingdom of God)
 Top Television
 UBC (Uganda Broadcasting Corporation)
 WBS (Wavah Broadcasting Service)
 ABC TV Uganda
 NTV Uganda
 NBS TV
 Urban TV Uganda
 ABS TV Uganda
 Face TV
 Salam TV
 Spark TV
 Chanel44 TV
 HGTV
 Salt TV
 Dream TV
 ARK TV
 HTV
 Magic One
 Delta TV
 BTM TV
 STV Uganda
 U24 TV
 Bukedde TV

Ukraine

 1+1
 ICTV
 STB
 Novyy Kanal
 Ukraine

United Arab Emirates

 Abu Dhabi Sports Channel
 Abu Dhabi Sports 2
 Abu Dhabi Sports 3
 Abu Dhabi TV
 Abu Dhabi TV +1
 Abu Dhabi TV Europe
 AEN (ADD)
 Al Arabiya
 Al Emarah
 Al Fayhaa
 Al Shasha (Showtime Arabia)
 Almajd Holy Quran
 Arabian Travel TV
 ART Movie World (ADD)
 ARY Digital Middle East
 CNN
 Cartoon Network Arabic
 Cartoon Network Middle East and North Africa
 Decision Makers TV
 CNBC Arabiya (ME Business News)
 Discovery Channel Middle East
 Disney Channel
 Disney XD (Closed as of 2021)
 Dubai Sports Channel
 Dubai TV
 Emirates Channel
 Fawasel TV
 Fujairah TV
 Home Cinema (Showtime Arabia)
 Infinity TV
 MAX Middle East
 MBC (Middle East Broadcasting Centre)
 MBC 2
 MBC 3
 MBC 4
 MET (Middle East Television)
 MTV Mashaweer (Showtime Arabia)
 Music Nation TV
 MusicPlus
 Nickelodeon (Showtime Arabia)
 Nojoom
 Nojoom 3
 Nojoom Al Khaleej
 One TV Dubai
 Paramount Comedy Channel (Showtime Arabia)
 Paramount Comedy Channel +2 (Showtime Arabia)
 Pehla Comedy (ADD)
 Pehla Fashion (ADD)
 Pehla Mix (ADD)
 Pehla Prime Time (ADD)
 Pehla Thriller (ADD)
 PMC (Persian Music Channel)
 Prime Sports
 Qanaty Channel
 Sama Dubai
 Selevision
 SET Middle East (Sony Entertainment TV)
 Sharjah TV
 Showtime Sport (Showtime Arabia)
 Spacetoon Arabic
 Spacetoon English (defunct)
 Spicy
 Channel [V] India
 Channel [V] International
 Fox News Channel
 Fox Sports
 ITV Choice
 Nat Geo Adventure UAE
 National Geographic Adventure UAE
 Sky News
 Star Movies
 Star News
 Star World
 Style UK (Showtime Arabia)
 Ten Sports India
 Ten Sports Middle East
 Ten Sports Pakistan
 The Movie Channel (Showtime Arabia)
 The Movie Channel +1 (Showtime Arabia)
 The Movie Channel 2 (Showtime Arabia)
 TV Land (Showtime Arabia)
 TV Land +2 (Showtime Arabia)
 TXT
 UNI Plus
 Zee Arabiya

United Kingdom

 BBC
 BBC One
 BBC Two
 BBC Three 
 BBC Four
 BBC Five
 BBC News
 BBC Parliament
 CBBC
 CBeebies
 BBC Alba (Scottish Gaelic)
 S4C (Welsh Language)
 ITV plc
 Independent Television (ITV)
 ITV
 UTV
 ITV2
 ITV3
 ITV4
 CITV
 ITVBe
 Scottish Television (STV)
 STV
 Channel Four Television Corporation
 Channel 4
 4seven
 Film4
 E4
 More4
 4Music – Co-owned with The Box Plus Network
 T4
 The Box Plus Network
 The Box
 Box Upfront
 Box Hits
 Kiss TV
 Magic
 Q
 Kerrang!
 Paramount Networks UK & Australia
 Channel 5
 5Star
 5 USA
 5Select
 5MTV
 Milkshake!
 Paramount Network
 MTV
Nickelodeon
Nick Jr.
Nicktoons
 Sky UK Limited
 Sky Max
 Sky Showcase
 Sky Replay
 Sky Witness
 Sky Crime
 Sky Atlantic
 Sky Arts
 Sky Comedy
 Sky Challenge
 Sky News
 Sky Sports (Main Event, Premier League, Football, Cricket, Golf, F1, Action, Arena, News, Mix, Racing), Box Office
 Sky Cinema (Action, Comedy, Disney, Drama, Family, Greats, Hits, Premiere, Sci Fi & Horror, Select, Thriller)
 BT Group
 BT Sport 1
 BT Sport 2
 BT Sport 3
 BT Sport 4
 ESPN
 BT Sport Ultimate
 Narrative Capital
 Pop
 Pop Max
 Great! TV
 Great! Crime
 Great! Movies
 Great! Movies Action
 Great! Movies Classic
 Tiny Pop
 WarnerMedia International
 Cartoonito
 Boomerang
 Cartoon Network

United States

United States Virgin Islands

Uruguay

 Saeta TV Channel 10
 Channel 4, Uruguay
 TV Nacional Uruguay (Canal 5)
 Teledoce – Canal 12
 Tevé Ciudad
 TV Libre
 VTV Uruguaya
 Red de Television Color
 TeleSUR

Uzbekistan

Vanuatu

 VBTC
 Television Blong Vanuatu

National channels:
 ABC
 ABC
 ABC Comedy
 ABC Me
 ABC News
 SBS
 SBS
 SBS Viceland
 NITV
 Southern Cross Central
 7Two
 7mate
 Imparja Television
 9GO!
 9GEM
 Ten Central
 Ten Peach
 Ten Boss

Vatican City

 CTV – local station

Venezuela

Vietnam

VTV – National public broadcaster, operates ten channels and dozen Pay TV channels network: 
VTV1 - News and current affairs
VTV2 - Education, Science and Sports
VTV3 - Sports and Entertainment
VTV4 - International Channel
VTV5 - Ethnic language (and VTV5 Southwest, VTV5 Central Highland)
VTV6 - Sports
VTV7 - Education and Children
VTV8 - Central Highland and Central Region 
VTV9 - Southeast Region
VTV Cần Thơ - Southwest Region
Al Jazeera
Al Jazeera English
Al Jazeera Mubasher
Animal Planet Asia
Animax
AXN
Arirang TV
Asian Food Network
Australia Network
Baby TV
BBC Earth
BBC Lifestyle
BBC World News
Boomerang Asia
Cartoon Network Asia
Cartoonito
CBeebies
CCTV-4 Asia
CGTN
CGTN Documentary
Channel NewsAsia
Channel One International
Cinemax Asia
CNBC Asia
CNN International
Da Vinci Kids
Discovery Channel Asia
Discovery Asia
DMAX
DreamWorks Channel
DW-TV
FashionTV
France 24
HBO Asia
HGTV
History Channel
KBS World
KIX
NHK World Japan
NHK World Premium
Outdoor Channel
Press TV
Rai Italia Asia
RTP Internacional
Rock Entertainment
Rock Action
RTR-Planeta
TLC Asia
TRT World
TV5 Monde Asie
TVE Internacional
Warner TV
WION
Dr. Fit
BOX HITS
BOX Movie¹
Happy Kids
HITS
Hollywood Classics
IN THE BOX Channel
Music Box
MAN
Planet Earth
WOMAN
SKTV Sports 1
SKTV Sports 2
SKTV Sports 3
SKTV Sports 4
VTVCab – The first Vietnamese cable pay television network (18 special channels are produced by VTVcab)
ON Sports Network (by VTVCab) 6 special channels
SCTV (Vietnam) – Saigontourist Cable Television - broadcasts many different pay channels. Among them, there are 23 channels produced by SCTV ( SCTV1 -> SCTV22 SCTV Phim tổng hợp)
K+ (VSTV) – Satellite Television (K+ CINE, K+ SPORT 2, K+ SPORT 1, K+ LIFE, K+ KIDS)
ANTV (People's Police Television), VOV TV (Voice of Vietnam), Quốc Hội TV (National Assembly Television), QPVN (Vietnam National Defence Television), TTXVN (Vietnam News Agency), Nhân Dân TV (Nhân Dân Television)
Ho Chi Minh City TV – The first TV station in Vietnam, includes 8 free-to-air channels:
HTV7 (HD/SD) - Entertainment and Sports
HTV9 (HD/SD) - News, Entertainment and Sports
HTV1 - Information
HTV2 - Entertainment 
HTV3 - General entertainment
HTV Key - Education 
HTV Thể Thao - Sports
HTV co.op - Shopping
HTVC – Ho Chi Minh City Cable Television - 8 pay channels (HTVC Thuần Việt, HTVC Gia Đình, HTVC Phụ Nữ, HTVC Phim, HTVC Du lịch, HTVC Ca Nhạc, HTVC+, HTVC Mua Sấm)
VTC – National digital broadcaster, includes many different 15 channels
62 provincial television stations

Wake Island

Wallis and Futuna

 MTV Wallis & Futuna
 MTV Base Africa
 France Ô
 RFO Télé Wallis & Futuna

Western Sahara

 RASD TV
 Radio Nacional de la RASD

Yemen

 STAR TV (Satellite Television for Asian Region Yemen)
 Channel [V] India
 Channel [V] International
 Fox News Channel
 Fox Sports
 ITV Choice
 Jetix
 Nat Geo Adventure Yemen
 National Geographic Adventure Yemen
 Sky News
 Star Movies
 Star News
 Star World
 Yemen Satellite Channel

Zambia

 ZNBC (Zambia National Broadcasting Corporation)
 ZNBC Tv1
 ZNBC Tv2
 ZNBC Tv3 (EDU Tv)
 Muvi TV
 Muvi Bakadoli
 MUVI NOVELA
 Muvi Prism Africa
 Muvi Nyimbo
 Datah
 Parliament Tv Zambia
 Africa Unite TV
 Hope Channel Zambia
 QTV
 Diamond Tv
 Camnet Tv
 City Tv
 CBC Tv

Zanzibar
 TVZ (Television Zanzibar)

Zimbabwe

 Ngatinyararei Matinyarare TV
 CCTV-9
 Disney Channel
 ExpressAfricaTelevision
 Harare Television
 JoyTV
 Kidz.Net
 Playboy TV
 Sky News Africa
 Spice TV
 Star Kidz
 TeleLink
 Telezim
 The Adult Channel
 ZBC (Zimbabwe Broadcasting Corporation)
 ZBC Kids
 ZBC Movies
 ZBC News
 ZBC Sports
 ZBC Style

References

External links
 Lists of US TV Stations
 MAVISE database on TV channels and TV companies in the European Union and candidate countries

Lists of companies by industry